|}

The Irish Oaks is a Group 1 flat horse race in Ireland open to three-year-old thoroughbred fillies. It is run at the Curragh over a distance of 1 mile and 4 furlongs (2,414 metres), and it is scheduled to take place each year in July.

It is Ireland's equivalent of The Oaks, a famous race in England.

History
The event was established in 1895, and it was originally contested over a mile. It was extended to its present length in 1915.

The field usually includes fillies which ran previously in the Epsom Oaks, and several have won both races. The first was Masaka in 1948, and the most recent was Snowfall in 2021.

The leading participants from the Irish Oaks sometimes go on to compete in the following month's Yorkshire Oaks. The last to achieve victory in both events was Snowfall in 2021.

Records
Leading jockey (6 wins):
 Johnny Murtagh – Ebadiyla (1997), Winona (1998), Petrushka (2000), Peeping Fawn (2007), Moonstone (2008), Chicquita (2013)

Leading trainer (6 wins):
 Sir Michael Stoute – Fair Salinia (1978), Colorspin (1986), Unite (1987), Melodist (1988, dead-heat), Pure Grain (1995), Petrushka (2000)
 Aidan O'Brien - Alexandrova (2006), Peeping Fawn (2007), Moonstone (2008), Bracelet (2014), Seventh Heaven (2016), Snowfall (2021)

Leading owner since 1960 (7 wins): (includes part ownership)
 Susan Magnier – Alexandrova (2006), Peeping Fawn (2007), Moonstone (2008), Bracelet (2014), Seventh Heaven (2016), Even So (2020), Snowfall (2021)

Winners since 1960

Earlier winners

 1895: Sapling
 1896: Kosmos
 1897: Dabchick
 1898: Sabine Queen
 1899: Irish Ivy
 1900: May Race
 1901: Royal Mantle
 1902: Marievale
 1903: Mary Lester
 1904: Topstone
 1905: Blakestown
 1906: Juliet
 1907: Reina
 1908: Queen of Peace
 1909: Fredith
 1910: Blair Royal
 1911: Tullynacree
 1912: Shining Way
 1913: Athgreany
 1914: May Edgar
 1915: Latharna
 1916: Captive Princess
 1917: Golden Maid
 1918: Judea
 1919: Snow Maiden
 1920: Place Royale
 1921: The Kiwi
 1922: Miss Hazelwood
 1923: Becka
 1924: Amethystine
 1925: Ixia
 1926: Resplendent
 1927: Cinq a Sept
 1928: Haintonette
 1929: Soloptic
 1930: Theresina
 1931: Nitsichin
 1932: Santaria
 1933: Salar
 1934: Foxcroft
 1935: Smokeless
 1936: Silversol
 1937: Sol Speranza
 1938: Conversation Piece
 1939: Superbe
 1940: Queen of Shiraz
 1941: Uvira
 1942: Majideh
 1943: Suntop
 1944: Avoca
 1945: Admirable
 1946: Linaria
 1947: Desert Drive
 1948: Masaka
 1949: Circus Lady
 1950: Corejada
 1951: Djebellica
 1952: Five Spots
 1953: Noory
 1954: Pantomime Queen
 1955: Agar's Plough
 1956: Garden State
 1957: Silken Glider
 1958: Amante
 1959: Discorea
 1960: Lynchris
 1961: Ambergris
 1962: French Cream
 1963: Hibernia
 1964: Ancasta
 1965: Aurabella
 1966: Merry Mate
 1967: Pampalina
 1968: Celina
 1969: Gaia

See also
 Horse racing in Ireland
 List of Irish flat horse races

References
 Paris-Turf:
 Racing Post:

 galopp-sieger.de – Irish Oaks.
 ifhaonline.org – International Federation of Horseracing Authorities – Irish Oaks (2019).
 irishracinggreats.com – Irish Oaks (Group 1).
 pedigreequery.com – Irish Oaks – Curragh.
 tbheritage.com – Irish Oaks Stakes.

Flat races in Ireland
Curragh Racecourse
Flat horse races for three-year-old fillies
Recurring sporting events established in 1895
1895 establishments in Ireland